The Committee for a Nuclear Free Island was an anti-nuclear group based in Staten Island, New York in the 1980s.

In the summer of 1983, the United States Navy announced it was seeking an East Coast location for a Surface Action Group. One of the sites that the Navy proposed was Staten Island, New York. In response, a small number of anti-nuclear and peace activists organized the Committee for a Nuclear Free Island, with most doubting a site in New York Harbor would actually be selected. However, a site on Staten Island's north shore in the community of Stapleton was selected. due to a former Staten Island Borough President, Robert Connor, lobbying within the Defense Department; support from the local daily newspaper, the Staten Island Advance; as well as support from elected officials.

After the site selection, the Committee for a Nuclear Free Island rapidly expanded its membership and formed a coalition with anti-nuclear and peace groups in the greater New York City area. Members distributed over thirty thousand pieces of literature throughout Staten Island and issued analyses of the Navy's various Environmental Impact Statements, printing the analyses for the public in Staten Island's weekly newspaper, the Staten Island Register.  The coalition checked on the credentials of Environmental Impact Statement authors, finding one fraudulent doctorate degree that resulted in breaking up a public hearing.

As a result of cutbacks in military and naval numbers, a Base Realignment and Closing Commission determined that the naval station on Staten Island was in excess of requirements, and it was cancelled before being completed.

References

Anti-nuclear organizations based in the United States